Bajón, or bajón, may refer to :
 the Spanish name of the dulcian, a Renaissance woodwind instrument predecessor of the modern bassoon
 Miguel Ángel Rodríguez Bajón (born in 1964), Spanish politician

Bajon is a family name of Polish origin :
 Anthony Bajon (born in 1994), French actor
 Filip Michał Bajon (born in 1947), Polish film director.